Leopold Heuvelmans (born 24 March 1945) is a former Belgian cyclist. He competed in the team time trial and the team pursuit events at the 1964 Summer Olympics.

References

1945 births
Living people
Belgian male cyclists
Olympic cyclists of Belgium
Cyclists at the 1964 Summer Olympics
People from Meerhout
Cyclists from Antwerp Province
20th-century Belgian people